Passengers was a mid-1990s and early-2000s Channel 4 television programme about youth culture.

Some time after its original mid-1990s incarnation, the programme was revived for a new series in early 2001, initially for sister station E4.

In its original mid-1990s incarnation, it featured a pre-Trainspotting Ewan McGregor, Geoff Thompson, Notorious B.I.G., Take That and drum and bass musician Goldie.  The theme tune was a portion of "The Passenger" by Iggy Pop and Ricky Gardiner.

References

External links

Channel 4 original programming
1994 British television series debuts
2002 British television series endings
British television talk shows
English-language television shows